Pallikoodam is a 2007 Indian Tamil language film directed and cinematographed by Thangar Bachchan.Narain, Sneha,  Sriya Reddy, Seeman and the director himself form the cast.  Sneha plays a teacher named Kokila, Narain plays Vetrivel, a collector, Sriya Reddy plays a nurse and Seeman plays Muthu. The film deals with four different periods – 1978, 1983, 1991 and 2004.

Plot 
The movie revolves around an ailing school in a village in Cuddalore district where the land owner wants to demolish the school while the old students prevent the school from getting shut. Kokila (Sneha) works in the school where she had also studied. The school was constructed by Kokila's grandfather years ago and dispute arises between her family members, where her uncle wanted to demolish the school and sell the land as the school is in a very bad state.

The school teachers come up with a plan of organising an alumni get together, so that the school can be saved. Kumarasamy aka Kumar (Thagar Bachan) is a poor man who lives in the same village and is the classmate of Kokila. He is sent to Kanchipuram to meet the district collector Vetrivel (Naren) who also happens to be the alumni of the same school. Vetri and Kumar were close friends during childhood and both feel happy meeting after years. Meanwhile, the two also get to meet Muthu (Seeman) who is a film director now and is also their close friend. All the three friends get united after many years.

A flashback is shown where Vetri, Kumar and Muthu were close friends during schooldays. All three belong to poor families and Vetri falls in love with his classmate Kokila, who is a rich girl. Jhansi (Shriya) is a nurse who visits the village for conducting a medical camp. All three boys get closer to Jhansi as she is kind and she looks after them very well. Jhansi takes care of Muthu's education after his father's sudden death.

Meanwhile, Vetri and Kokila's love affair is known to her family members and they accuse that Jhansi helped the love and insults her in front of the villagers. Jhansi gets hurt and leaves the village. Muthu also leaves the village along with Jhansi . Vetri goes out of village for undergraduation. Vetri clears civil services and comes back to village with plans of marrying Kokila in a registrar office. But Kokila refuses getting married without her family's consent and requests Vetri to meet her parents once with the hope that they would agree as he is well educated now. But, Kokila's father beat Vetri and his father and in the fight, Vetri's father dies. Kokila's family members lock her in a room. Vetri gets furious that Kokila didn't turn up at the time of his visit and also worries due to his father's death. Vetri decides to leave the village with no plans of returning again.

Coming back to present, all three friends meet and share their old good memories. Muthu is married and he takes care of Jhansi still. Also Kumar is married. Kumar describes the pathetic state of their old school in village and requests them to take some action to prevent it from getting shut. The friends decides to try all means to conduct an alumni reunion. But Vetri is not interested to return to the village as he has been humiliated by Kokila's family members long time ago. Kumar and Muthu convince Vetri to come to village. Kokila still loves Vetri but Kumar lies to Kokila that Vetri is married which makes Kokila angry. Kokila feels that Vetri has ditched her and started a new life while she still loves him.

An event has been organized to celebrate the 75th year of the school by inviting all the alumni. Vetri and Muthu are invited as special guests as that would make the event more popular. Vetri and Muthu arrive at the village and visit their school. Vetri and Kokila do not talk to each other. The event is organized in a grand manner and this attracts the media attention also. But still the land owner wants to demolish the school. Vetri files a case on behalf of the school against Kokila's uncle and gets the verdict in favour of the school. The event successfully happens and everyone feels happy that the school is saved as many alumni donate for renovation works.

Now Kumar informs the truth that Vetri is not yet married and he just lied so that Kokila will forget him and make her mind for marrying someone else. Kokila understands Vetri's love meanwhile Vetri also understands that Kokila was helpless and was locked up by her family members while Vetri was beaten. Vetri and Kokila get united in the end.

Cast 
 Narain as Vetrivel
 Sneha as Kokila
 Shreya Gupto as child Kokila
 Sriya Reddy as Jency
 Seeman as Muthuvel 
 Thangar Bachchan as Kumarasamy
 Meenal as Vasantha
 V. Sekhar as Educational officer
 Nagineedu as Kokila's Uncle

Production
The film was launched in August 2004 with Madhavan and Cheran in leading roles. They later opted out of the project.

Soundtrack 
The music was composed by Bharadwaj.

Awards 
Tamil Nadu State Film Award for Best Director - Thangar Bachan.

Critical reception 
Rediff wrote "while Pallikkoodam lacks the class of Azhagi, you can at least return home with memories of your school life." Indiaglitz wrote "On the whole, the movie is good and takes one on a nostalgic journey". Behindwoods wrote "Overall the movie is well made and will be lapped up by the urban audience. If you thought Azhagi was a fantastic effort, chances are that you would have the same feeling with Tahnkar Bachaan’s new effort as well. Besides, the emotional aspect of the movie is sure to go down well with the female audience."

Box office 
 The film grossed $110 million at the box office.
 The movie is based on the novel Kalavadiya Pozhudhugal (Stolen Moments) by Thangar Bachchan himself.
 Producer Viswas Sundar has sent a two-hour international copy of the film with English and French sub-titles to Canada.

References

External links 
 

2007 films
2000s Tamil-language films
Films scored by Bharadwaj (composer)
Films directed by Thangar Bachan